The  is a national expressway in the Shikoku region of Japan. The expressway is numbered E11 between Naruto and Tokushima Junctions and E32 between Tokushima and Kawanoe-Higashi Junctions under the MLIT's "2016 Proposal for Realization of Expressway Numbering.

Overview
The first section of the Takamatsu Expressway to open was between Aizumi and Wakimachi interchanges on 17 March 1994. The final section of the expressway (21.5 km between Ikawa-Ikeda Interchange and Kawanoe-Higashi Junction) was opened on 11 March 2000.

The route is 2 lanes for its entire length, with some overtaking areas. The speed limit is 70 km/h.

List of interchanges and features

 IC - interchange, SIC - smart interchange, JCT - junction, SA - service area, PA - parking area, BS - bus stop, TN - tunnel, TB - toll gate

Kilometer markers between Naruto Junction and Tokushima Interchange show the distance from Naruto Junction plus 300 (the marker at Naruto Junction is 300.0 while the marker at Tokushima Interchange is 310.1).
{|table class="wikitable"
|-
!style="border-bottom:3px solid green;"|No.
!style="border-bottom:3px solid green;"|Name
!style="border-bottom:3px solid green;"|Connections
!style="border-bottom:3px solid green;"|Dist. fromOrigin
!style="border-bottom:3px solid green;"|Bus Stop
!style="border-bottom:3px solid green;"|Notes
!colspan="2" style="border-bottom:3px solid green;"|Location
|-
! style="background:#bfb;"|7
|Naruto JCT
| Takamatsu Expressway
|style="text-align:right;"|300.0
|style="text-align:center;"|
|
|Naruto
|rowspan="14" style="width:1em;"|Tokushima
|-
! style="background:#bfb;"|1-1
|Matsushige PA/SIC
|Pref. Route 40 (Tokushima Airport Route) 
|style="text-align:right;"|302.5
|style="text-align:center;"|
|
|Matsushige
|-
!style="background-color:#BFB;"|
|style="background-color:#ffdead;"|Tokushima JCT
|style="background-color:#ffdead;"| Shikoku-Ōdan Expressway
|style="background-color:#ffdead; text-align:right;"|308.5
|style="background-color:#ffdead; text-align:center;"|
|style="background-color:#ffdead;"|Expected to open in 2021
|rowspan="3"|Tokushima
|-
! style="background:#bfb;"|1
|Tokushima IC
| National Route 11 (Yoshinogawa Bypass)
|style="text-align:right;"|310.1
|style="text-align:center;"|
|
|-
!style="background-color: #BFB;"|TB
|style="background-color:#CCC;"|Tokushima TB
|style="background-color:#CCC;"|
|style="background-color:#CCC; text-align:right; "|3.1
|style="background-color:#CCC; text-align:center; "|
|style="background-color:#CCC;"|abandoned on June 4, 2013
|-
! style="background:#bfb;"|2
|Aizumi IC
|Pref. Route 1 (Tokushima Hiketa Route) 
|style="text-align:right;"|9.1
|style="text-align:center;"|
|
|Aizumi
|-
!style="background-color:#BFB;"|PA
|Kamiita PA
|
|style="text-align:right;"|15.916.7
|style="text-align:center;"|○
|Kawanoe-boundNaruto-bound
|Kamiita
|-
! style="background:#bfb;"|3
|Donari IC
| National Route 318
|style="text-align:right;"|22.3
|style="text-align:center;"|△
|
|rowspan="2"|Awa
|-
!style="background-color:#BFB;"|PA
|Awa PA/SIA
|
|style="text-align:right;"|37.137.4
|style="text-align:center;"|○
|Naruto-boundKawanoe-boundSIA planned
|-
! style="background:#bfb;"|4
|Wakimachi IC
| National Route 193
|style="text-align:right;"|41.2
|style="text-align:center;"|○ 
|
|rowspan="2"|Mima
|-
!style="background-color:#BFB;"|5
|Mima IC
| National Route 438
|style="text-align:right;"|52.7
|style="text-align:center;"|△
|
|-
!style="background-color:#BFB;"|5-1
|Yoshinogawa PA/SIC
|
|style="text-align:right;"|68.5
|style="text-align:center;"|○
|SIC: Open 06:00-22:00incl. Yoshinogawa Bus Stop
|Higashimiyoshi
|-
! style="background:#bfb;"|6
|Ikawa-Ikeda IC
| National Route 32 National Route 192
|style="text-align:right;"|73.8
|style="text-align:center;"|
|
|rowspan="2"|Miyoshi
|-
!style="background-color:#BFB;"|PA
|Ikeda PA
|
|style="text-align:right;"|86.8
|style="text-align:center;"|
|
|-
! style="background:#bfb;"|7
|Kawanoe-Higashi JCT
| Kōchi Expressway
|style="text-align:right;"|95.3
|style="text-align:center;"|
|
|Shikokuchūō
|style="width:1em;"|Ehime
|-

References

External links 
 West Nippon Expressway Company

Expressways in Japan